Ihu Rural LLG is a local-level government (LLG) of Gulf Province, Papua New Guinea.

Wards
01. Avavu
02. Harevavo
03. Kaivukavu
04. Arehava
05. Kavava
06. Harilarewa
07. Lariau
08. Pakovavu
09. Haruape
11. Lovehoho
12. Ovahuhu
13. Vailala
14. Karokaro
15. Herehere
16. Koialahu
17. Lepokela
18. Akapiru
19. Hepa
20. Heawa
21. Mailava
22. Belepa
84. Ihu Station

References

Local-level governments of Gulf Province